The White House's art collection, sometimes also called the White House Collection or Pride of the American Nation, has grown over time from donations from descendants of the Founding Fathers to commissions by established artists. It comprises paintings, sculptures, and other art forms. At times, the collection grows from a president's specific request, such as when Ronald Reagan began collecting the work of naval artist Tom Freeman in 1986, a tradition that continued through the Obama years.

History
The White House's Art collection was established by an Act of Congress in 1961 and grew extensively during the Kennedy Administration. It now includes more than 65,000 objects if individual items are catalogued.
As of 2021, there are more than 500 pieces on view under the care of the White House Curator and the White House Historical Association, and these are often complemented by those on loan from museums.

Gallery
Portraits

Non-portraits

Cézanne works

See also
 Committee for the Preservation of the White House
 United States Capitol art
 White House Acquisition Trust

References
Notes

Sources

External links
The White House Collection